Champion Bay Senior High School (previously John Willcock College) is a comprehensive public co-educational middle day school, located in Karloo, a suburb of Geraldton, a regional centre  north west of Perth, Western Australia.

Overview 
The school was established in 1975 as a high school catering for students from Year 8 to Year 10. In 1983 the first cohort of Year 11 students occurred and the school became John Willcock Senior High School. The school was amalgamated with Geraldton Senior College in 1997 and was known as the Geraldton Secondary College (Highbury Campus). By 2003 the name was changed again to John Willcock College and the school catered for students from Year 8 to 9 with most students continuing onto the senior college upon graduating. In 2019 the school was renamed and commenced the process of becoming a full six-year high school, with the addition of a new year group each year for the next three years.

The school was named after John Willcock, the 15th premier of Western Australia.

Enrolments at the school

The school was closed temporarily in 2008 after being swamped following heavy rain. Several classrooms were damaged.

Later the same year vandals caused over $15,000 worth of damage to the school. Three teenage boys smashed about 40 windows then flooded many rooms using a fire hose. Local police apprehended them at the site.

In 2010 the school was the subject of intense media scrutiny following the broadcast of violent video footage of students at the school attacking each other. The unprovoked students had filmed tag team fights with other unsuspecting students then circulating the images on their mobile phones. The principal, Julie Campbell, was shocked at the footage which involved only a small number of female students. Parents were contacted saying that the culprits would be suspended and that the college had made huge strides in managing behavior.

A bushfire was started by a 12-year-old student behind the college in 2013 that eventually burned out  of bushland that threatened properties in Karloo.

See also
List of schools in rural Western Australia

References

External links
 http://www.championbayshs.wa.edu.au/

Public high schools in Western Australia
1975 establishments in Australia
Educational institutions established in 1975
Geraldton